Philadelphia shooting may refer to:

Lex Street massacre, 2000
Shooting of Jesse Hartnett, 2016
2022 Philadelphia shooting